"Breakin' All Over Town" is a song recorded by Canadian country music artist Joan Kennedy. It was released in 1993 as the third single from her fifth studio album, Higher Ground (1992). It peaked at number 9 on the RPM Country Tracks chart in September 1993.

The song was originally recorded by Conway Twitty for his 1990 album Crazy in Love as "Hearts Breakin' All Over Town".

Chart performance

References

1990 songs
1993 singles
Conway Twitty songs
Joan Kennedy (musician) songs
MCA Records singles
Songs written by Pam Tillis
Songs written by Karen Staley